The Platform Prize is an annual film award, presented by the Toronto International Film Festival to films of "high artistic merit that also demonstrate a strong directorial vision." Introduced in 2015, the award is presented to a film, selected by an international jury of three prominent filmmakers or actors, from among the films screened in the Platform program. The program normally screens between eight and twelve films; only one winner is selected each year, although as with TIFF's other juried awards the jurors have the discretion to give honorable mentions to other films besides the overall winner.

The winner of the Platform Prize receives $25,000 from the award's current corporate sponsor, Air France.

According to festival programmer Cameron Bailey, the Platform program and prize were established because "films are passing through the festival without the attention they deserve". He compared Platform's intentions to the Cannes Film Festival's Directors' Fortnight and Un Certain Regard streams rather than its Palme d'Or award, indicating that it was meant to provide a platform for distinctive or innovative films but not to supplant the People's Choice Award as the top award at the festival. The award is named after filmmaker Jia Zhang-ke's 2000 historical drama.

Critical response
In some years, the film magazine Screen International has convened its own unofficial panel of film critics, who were assigned to watch all the Platform films and conduct their own independent vote on which film should win the award. Their panel in 2017 selected Warwick Thornton's Sweet Country, the same film that won the prize, but their panel in 2018 split between two films, Benjamín Naishtat's  and Emir Baigazin's The River, while the festival jury awarded the prize to Ho Wi Ding's Cities of Last Things; the jury did, however, give The River an honorable mention.

Other critics have questioned whether the Platform Prize has been effective at accomplishing its stated goals at all. Canadian documentary filmmaker Alan Zweig, who won the inaugural Platform Prize in 2015 for his film Hurt, noted that while it was not the least successful film of his career in general release, the prize did not appear to give the film any major boost in distribution or box office sales over his other films. The 2016 jury's choice of Pablo Larraín's Jackie has also been questioned by critics, in particular because the Platform lineup that year also included Moonlight, which went on to win the Academy Award for Best Picture.

Films
† denotes a non-winning film which received an honorable mention from the jury.

References

Toronto International Film Festival awards